Dr. Park's Clinic is a South Korean streaming television series directed by Seo Jun-beom and starring Lee Seo-jin and Ra Mi-ran. It premiered on TVING on January 14, 2022.

Synopsis
A medical comedy about Dr. Park Won-jang (Lee Seo-jin), a new doctor, struggling with the demands of his vocation.

Cast

Main
 Lee Seo-jin as Dr. Park Won-jang
 Director of a new medicine clinic, which is struggling in term of patient visit. Due to constant pressure from his clinic's low visitor, piling up debt and family lifestyle, he starts losing hair, therefore has to wear wig most of the time.
 Ra Mi-ran as Sa Mo-rim
 Park Won-jang's wife, who gently wraps her husband's shoulder. She tries to understand her husband's financial situation however she kept spending her husband's money with her lifestyle that is mainly influenced by TV shows.

Supporting
 Cha Chung-hwa as Cha Mi-young
 The head nurse at Park Won-jang's medicine clinic.
 Shin Eun-jung as Sunwoo Soo-ji
 The director of an anal surgery with an innocent appearance and rough speech.
 Kim Kwang-kyu as Ji Min-ji
 An obstetrician and gynecologist who is a lover of mixed coffee.
 Jung Hyung-suk as Choi Hyung-suk
 The director of the urology department.
 Seo Bum-june as Cha Ji-hoon
 Son of Cha Mi-young and a new nurse who works undercover at Park Won-jang's medicine clinic.
 Joo Woo-yeon as Park Min-gu
 Park Won-jang's gluttonous first son who has physical strength stronger than human being.
 Han Da-sol as Yoon-ji
 Cha Ji-hoon's girlfriend.
 Kim Kang-hoon as Park Dong-gu
 Park Won-jang's second son and a young YouTuber.

Special appearances
 Park Sung-woong
 An uber rich and successful doctor and clinic director. His clinic has never been low of visitor.
 Yoo Byung-jae

Viewership

Notes

References

External links
  
 
 

Korean-language television shows
2022 South Korean television series debuts 
2022 South Korean television series endings
South Korean comedy-drama television series
South Korean medical television series
Television shows based on South Korean webtoons
TVING original programming
South Korean drama web series
South Korean web series